Cathy Tilton is an American politician from Alaska. A Republican, she is a member of the Alaska House of Representatives, representing District 12 since 2015. She succeeded Bill Stoltze upon his election to the Alaska State Senate. She is a self-employed real estate professional and former legislative aide. She lives in Wasilla. Tilton was elected Speaker of the House on January 18, 2023.

References

External links
 Rep. Tilton's House Majority Page

|-

1962 births
21st-century American politicians
21st-century American women politicians
American real estate brokers
Living people
Republican Party members of the Alaska House of Representatives
People from Wasilla, Alaska
Place of birth missing (living people)
Women state legislators in Alaska